Josef “Sepp” Allgeier (6 February 1895 – 11 March 1968) was a German cinematographer who worked on around fifty features, documentaries and short films.  He began his career as a cameraman in 1911 for the Expreß Film Co. of Freiburg.  In 1913 he filmed newsreels in the Balkans.  He then became an assistant to Arnold Fanck, a leading director of Mountain films. He worked frequently with Luis Trenker and Leni Riefenstahl, both closely associated with the genre. He was Riefenstahl's lead cameraman on her 1935 propaganda film Triumph of the Will. During the Second World War, Allgeier filmed material for newsreels. He later worked in West German television. His son is the cinematographer Hans-Jörg Allgeier.

Selected filmography
 Mountain of Destiny (1924)
 The Holy Mountain (1926)
 The Great Leap (1927)
 Alpine Tragedy (1927)
 Milak, the Greenland Hunter  (1928)
 Struggle for the Matterhorn (1928)
 Diary of a Lost Girl (1929)
 The White Hell of Pitz Palu (1929)
 Storm Over Mont Blanc (1930)
 Mountains on Fire (1931)
 The Rebel (1932)
 Baroud (1932)
 William Tell (1934)
 The Champion of Pontresina (1934)
 Frisians in Peril (1935)
 Escape Me Never (1935)
 Ewiger Wald (1936)
 Militiaman Bruggler (1936)
 The Great Barrier (1937)
 The Mountain Calls (1938)
 A German Robinson Crusoe (1940)
 The Sinful Village (1940)
 Wetterleuchten um Barbara (1941)
 Border Post 58 (1951)

References

Bibliography
 Allgeier, Sepp (1931) Die Jagd nach dem Bild; 18 Jahre als Kameramann in Arktis und Hochgebirge Stuttgart: J. Engelhorns nachf. OCLC 9001961
 von Savigny, Brigitte; Allgeier, Sepp (1999) Sepp Allgeier Fotografien eines Kamerapioniers Furtwangen DesignConcepts-Verl. 
 Sepp Allgeier Archetype of a Camera Man (1999) film by Sigrid Faltin
 Klien, Arno (2004) “Sepp Allgeier and the First High Mountain Movie” in 3rd FIS Ski History Conference at Winter! Sport! Museum! Mürzzuschlag, Austria pg 11
 Von Moltke, Johannes (2005) No Place Like Home: Locations of Heimat in German Cinema University of California Press  pg 45
 Masia, Seth (September 2006) "Moving Pictures" Skiing Heritage Journal Vol 18 #3:37
 Allen, E. John B. (2007) The Culture and Sport of Skiing: From Antiquity to World War II  Amherst: University of Massachusetts Press  pg 262
 Reimer, Robert Charles & Reimer, Carol J. (2010) The A to Z of German Cinema Rowman & Littlefield

External links
Sepp Allgeier at filmportal.de

1895 births
1968 deaths
Film people from Freiburg im Breisgau
People from the Grand Duchy of Baden
German cinematographers